Crofton was a village in the area of Stubbington that was mentioned in the Domesday Book in 1086. It was called 'Croftone' then. This is where many local facilities derive their name, such as Crofton Secondary School. The community centre, once Stubbington House School that educated Polar explorer Robert Falcon Scott, is also named after Crofton.

References

Villages in Hampshire